Washington's 14th legislative district is one of forty-nine districts in Washington state for representation in the state legislature.

The district includes all of Klickitat and Skamania counties, most of western Yakima County, and a slice of eastern Clark County.

This mostly rural district is represented by state senator Curtis King and state representatives Chris Corry (position 1) and Gina Mosbrucker (position 2), all Republicans.

See also
Washington Redistricting Commission
Washington State Legislature
Washington State Senate
Washington House of Representatives

References

External links
Washington State Redistricting Commission
Washington House of Representatives
Map of Legislative Districts

14